Christopher Glynn (born 5 September 1974) is an English classical pianist and festival director. He is especially noted for his work as an accompanist with many leading classical singers. He is also Artistic Director of the Ryedale Festival.

Biography 
Born in Leicester, Christopher Glynn read music at New College, Oxford before studying piano with John Streets in France and Malcolm Martineau at the Royal Academy of Music. He has subsequently performed as a piano accompanist with singers including Sir Thomas Allen, Claire Booth, Allan Clayton, Lucy Crowe, Sophie Daneman, Bernarda Fink, Anthony Rolfe Johnson, Christiane Karg, Jonas Kaufmann, Yvonne Kenny, Dame Felicity Lott, Christopher Maltman, Joan Rodgers, Kate Royal, Toby Spence, Bryn Terfel, Ailish Tynan, Roderick Williams and Catherine Wyn Rogers. He has also performed with instrumentalists including Julian Bliss, David Garrett, Tine Thing Helseth, Andrej Bielow, Daniel Hope and with several chamber ensembles. Christopher Glynn has also performed and recorded as a pianist with The Sixteen choir. Glynn has performed at venues including Wigmore Hall, Carnegie Hall, Royal Opera House, Aldeburgh Festival and the BBC Proms. In 2010 he appeared on stage as part of a multimedia production entitled The Way to the Sea at the Aldeburgh Festival.

In 2011 he curated a series of concerts for the Wigmore Hall where he performed all the songs of Ravel.  He was an adjudicator in 2011 Kathleen Ferrier competition and is also a professor at the Royal College of Music.

Awards 

 2001 Kathleen Ferrier Competition - Accompaniment Prize 
 2003 Gerald Moore award
 2012 Grammy Award - Light and Gold album with Eric Whitacre and the Eric Whitacre singers

Ryedale Festival 

Since 2010 Christopher Glynn has been Artistic Director of the Ryedale Festival.

Recordings 

 Songs of Michael Head: with Ailish Tynan, Catherine Wyn Rogers, Roderick Williams (Hyperion CDA67899) 
 Brahms: Zigeunerlieder with Consortium and Andrew-John Smith  (Hyperion CDA67775) 
 Reger: Choral Music with Consortium and Andrew-John Smith   (Hyperion CDA67762)
 Brahms: Ein Deutsches Requiem with The Sixteen (COR16050)
 The Ancient Question: with Hila Plitmann and Julian Bliss and Andras Kaljusutes (Signum SIGCD276)
 Light and Gold: with Eric Whitacre and the Eric Whitacre singers (Decca)

References

External links 
Artist website: Christopher Glynn Classical Pianist Homepage
Ryedale Festival: Ryedale Festival - Great Music and Arts - Christopher Glynn - Artistic Director
 Agent's website
 Hyperion records 
 Ryedale Festival 
 Christopher Glynn performing with Kate Royal

1974 births
Living people
People from Leicester
English classical pianists
Male classical pianists
Accompanists
Artistic directors (music)
Alumni of New College, Oxford
Alumni of the Royal Academy of Music
Academics of the Royal College of Music
Grammy Award winners
Musicians from Leicestershire
21st-century classical pianists
21st-century British male musicians